Tallinn, the capital and largest city of Estonia, is home to 79 completed high-rises, 9 church spires, a defence tower (Pikk Hermann), Town Hall and 8 structures (including TV tower) taller than 45 metres (148 feet). 22 high-rises are located in the Midtown (Kesklinn), 57 high-rises are located in the outskirts, churches with one exception (Estonian Methodist Church) are found in the Old Town.

List

High-rise